{{Infobox Brewery
| name           = Twickenham Fine Ales
| image          = File:Twickenham-Brewery.jpeg
| caption        = Handcrafted beers from 
| location       =  18 Mereway Road
Twickenham
TW2 6RG
| owner          =  Steve Brown
| opened         = 2004
| production     = 
| url              = 

| active_beers   = {{brewbox_beer|name=Naked Ladies |style=Golden Ale}}
    
    

| seasonal_beers = 
    

    
    

}}Twickenham Fine Ales' is a microbrewery in Twickenham in the London Borough of Richmond upon Thames. Founded by Steve Brown in 2004, it claims to be the first brewery in Twickenham since the closure of Cole’s Brewery in 1906. It opened in September 2004 and is now the oldest independent brewery in London. It has been brewing at its current premises in Mereway Road, Twickenham since December 2012.

Its range of ales includes Naked Ladies'', named after the statues in the gardens of York House, Twickenham. A bottled version of this beer was launched in 2013.

References

External links

2004 establishments in England
Breweries in London
British companies established in 2004
Food and drink companies established in 2004
Twickenham